Herb Alpert: Music for Your Eyes is a 2002 American documentary film about the paintings and sculptures of musician and record producer Herb Alpert.  It was written, produced and directed by Tom Neff.  The soundtrack of the film is co-composed and performed by Alpert.

Synopsis
This documentary explores Herb Alpert's abstract paintings and his more figurative bronze sculptures, focusing on the first major retrospective of his work given at the Tennessee State Museum.  It shows how music has infused his paintings and sculptures through color, concept, and form.

The entire musical score to this visual film is composed and played by Herb Alpert, and his personality is probed through his artwork.

Interviews
 Herb Alpert
 Lois Riggins-Ezzell, Executive Director, Tennessee State Museum in Nashville
 Phil Kreuger
 Peter Frank
 Lani Alpert Hall
 Kristan Marvell

Background
The film is based on the museum exhibition, "Herb Alpert: Music for Your Eyes."  The exhibition was on view at the museum in 2001 and features Herb Alpert's paintings and sculptures he created from 1978 to 2001.

References

External links
 Tom Neff official web site (see Films for film clip)
 
 Herb Alpert interview re "Music for Your Eyes" art catalog and show at NPR

2002 films
2002 documentary films
American documentary films
Films directed by Tom Neff
American independent films
Herb Alpert
2002 independent films
2000s English-language films
2000s American films